Marwan Parham Al Awadhi (born 6 June 1981), better known by his stage name DJ Bliss, is an Emirati disc jockey, emcee, TV presenter and radio personality working in Dubai. In addition to being actively involved in the nightclub and DJ scene in Dubai, he is known for his music production including co-producing Wyclef Jean and releasing his own single and compilation album The Projects. The album was released on BMGI Middle East and was top 10 on Middle East album chart of Virgin. 

He is also credited as one of the first Emirati citizen DJs to go on world tour. He previously hosted the television show That's Entertainment on Dubai One as well as the radio show The Real Flava on Channel 4 in Dubai. On 12 February 2016 in a milestone achievement, DJ Bliss became the first Emirati DJ or artist to have a number 1 album, Made in Dubai on iTunes.

Biography
DJ Bliss has established himself as one of the UAE's and region's leading personalities and entertainers, who has expanded his career internationally. DJ Bliss is the first Emirati artist to sign with major multi-national music companies including BMG in 2003 and most recently with the world's largest global music company Universal Music.

In the late 1990s, DJ Bliss's music career took its first steps initially working small DJ jobs at a theme park, progressing to landing a guest DJ spot on a Dubai radio station. Just a couple of years later, he would find himself winning the Middle East Regional 'Palm DJ of the year award'. This would then lead to his first taste of international stardom with a performance for Ministry of Sound in London.

DJ Bliss continued to grow his personal brand in the early 2000s, becoming one of the most in demand local DJ and TV personalities after the success of his That's Entertainment TV show. Simultaneously, he followed his passion of becoming an accomplished music producer, artist and entrepreneur; consequently building his own successful entertainment company Bliss Inc. Entertainment.

By the late 2000s, DJ Bliss had started promoting his own parties, booking artists and DJs such as DJ Jazzy Jeff, Mos Def, DJ Drama, DJ Whoo Kid and many more. The success of these nights caught the attention of the local music industry, and as a result it led to DJ Bliss having his very own hit weekly radio show.

DJ Bliss's career would continue to climb significantly over the last couple of years, with international tour dates in various major cities in Europe and Asia, as well as sharing the main stage as an opening act with major international artists such as Wiz Khalifa and Prince. By 2014, DJ Bliss signed to an U.S based DJ/Talent booking agency named Skam Artist who took his tour to the U.S in which he performed at some prestigious nightclubs located in various U.S. states.

Whilst touring, DJ Bliss focused on being recognized for his own music and collaborations with headline Grammy Award-winning artists such as Shaggy and Wyclef Jean. Highlights included co-producing Wyclef Jean's 2013 mixtape April Showers, as well as releasing his own first single "Let It Go" ft Kardinal Offishall.

After signing to Universal Music MENA, DJ Bliss released a hit single "Shining" ft. international rapper Mims and Daffy and more recently released his compilation album Made in Dubai ft. various local artists from Dubai which skyrocketed straight to #1 on the UAE iTunes charts.

Career
DJ Bliss was born and raised in Dubai and began his career while still in high school. His brother taught him how to play both the guitar and drums which is what he attributes for his love of music. DJ Bliss had a radio show while still in school and at the beginning of college. He was also in a band named KRAK (later changed to Cyanide) and also began to DJ at the same time, playing at parties of his friends. DJ Bliss used to appear on Radio One as a guest DJ on Teenzpoint.com and Crazyspin.com.

DJ Bliss is known as one of the top DJs in the Emirates. In 2005, he won the top prize at a Middle East DJ competition. This gave him the opportunity to DJ at Ministry of Sound, a renowned nightclub in London. He has also spun at private parties for musicians such as Kanye West and Akon. He performs in clubs such as People by Crystal where he hosts his 411 Nights. He has also toured internationally playing at venues in Mauritius, Paris, Barcelona, Hong Kong and Malaysia.

DJ Bliss, often referred to as the "Ryan Seacrest of the Middle East", previously hosted the show That's Entertainment. As part of his work on the show, he interviewed celebrities such as James Blunt, Nicki Minaj, and Paris Hilton.

In late 2011, DJ Bliss released his first single entitled "Everything About You". He followed up in 2012 with the release of his first music video entitled "Let It Go". The video featured Canadian rapper Kardinal Offishall who also performed lyrics in the song. DJ Bliss and Offishall originally met in 2009 when Offishall was on tour with Akon. In late 2012, it was announced that DJ Bliss would be on the international judges panel for the 1st annual Dubai International Music Awards in November 2013 along with Hype Williams, SoFly and Nius, Woo Rhee, and Mokobé.

DJ Bliss has been referred to as the "Middle East's representative of Beats" by Dr. Dre. In 2013, he flew to Miami to be featured in a Wyclef Jean song entitled "Mid Life Crisis", which was produced by DJ Bliss and Prince Q. Bliss was signed to Universal Music MENA  and the first DJ in the MENA region to be signed to booking agency SKAM Artist in the US in 2015. DJ Bliss is also the founder of Bliss Inc Entertainment, an events and promotion company which includes Beats and Cuts Barber Shop based out of Dubai.

Since 2022, DJ Bliss has been a main cast member on the Netflix reality television show Dubai Bling.

Awards
 2012, Nightlife Award 'Best Urban Night', Time Out Dubai
 2012, HOT 100 'Trendsetter', Ahlan!
 2011, World's Top DJs 'Best Local DJ', Time Out Dubai
 2011, The Hot 40, Gulf News
 2011, Hot Bachelor, Cosmopolitan Magazine Middle East
 2010, Hot 100 Up & Coming,  Ahlan!
 2009 and 2008, Bachelor of the Year, VIVA Magazine
 2009, Hot 100 'Up & Coming', Ahlan!

References

External links
 The Official Website of D.J. Bliss
 D.J. Bliss Media Links
 The Real Flava Website

1981 births
Living people
Mass media in Dubai
Dubai One original programming